Skryje may refer to the following villages in Czech Republic:
 Skryje (Rakovník District)
 Skryje (Havlíčkův Brod District)
 Skryje (Brno-Country District)